The 2019 Turning Point was a professional wrestling event produced by Impact Wrestling in conjunction with Pennsylvania Premiere Wrestling. The event was streamed live on Impact Plus and took place on November 9, 2019 at the Holy Family Academy in Hazleton, Pennsylvania. It was the 13th event in the Turning Point chronology and the first to be held as an Impact Plus Monthly Special

Production

Background
In 2013, Impact Wrestling (then known as Total Nonstop Action Wrestling) discontinued monthly pay-per-view events in favor of the pre-recorded One Night Only events. Turning Point was produced as a PPV from 2004 until 2012. On October 13, 2019, Impact Wrestling announced on its website that Turning Point would return as a monthly special for Impact Plus and would be taking place on November 9.

Storylines
At Bound for Glory, Brian Cage defeated Sami Callihan in a no disqualification match to retain the Impact World Championship. During This is IMPACT!, a special episode of Impact's weekly television series, Cage was being interviewed by Josh Mathews and Scott D'Amore on his successful title defense against Callihan. Callihan interrupted Cage and demanded a rematch, showing footage of oVe members hauning Cage's house with his family inside. Cage would accept Callihan's challenge for a steel cage match on IMPACT's premiere on AXS TV. Callihan defeated Cage in the steel cage match to win the Impact World Championship. On October 30, Impact Wrestling announced that Cage was invoking his rematch clause for the World Championship against Callihan at Turning Point.

At Bound for Glory, Rob Van Dam turned on Rhino during their three-way match against The North and the team of Rich Swann and Willie Mack for the World Tag Team Championship. This led to RVD turn into a villain and explained his betrayal on the October 29 episode of Impact Wrestling that no one stole his finishing move which led to Rhino confronting him and challenging him to a match at Turning Point.

At Bound for Glory, Ace Austin won a five-man ladder match to win the X Division Championship, setting up a title match between Austin and former champion Jake Crist for the X Division Championship at Turning Point.

Results

References

Impact Wrestling Turning Point
2019 in professional wrestling
November 2019 events in the United States
2019 in Pennsylvania
Professional wrestling in Pennsylvania
Events in Pennsylvania
2019 Impact Plus Monthly Special events